Milz is a village and a former municipality in the district of Hildburghausen, in Thuringia, Germany. Since 31 December 2012, it is part of the town Römhild.

Former municipalities in Thuringia